Khorram Makan (also Romanized as Khorram Makān; also known as Khorramkān) is a village in Khorram Makan Rural District, Kamfiruz District, Marvdasht County, Fars Province, Iran. At the 2006 census, its population was 794, in 171 families.

References 

Populated places in Marvdasht County